WDBQ-FM (107.5 MHz) is a radio station broadcasting a classic hits format. Located near Galena, Illinois, United States, the station serves the Dubuque, Iowa area. The station is owned by Townsquare Media and licensed to Townsquare License, LLC.

History
The station went on the air as WJOD on 1988-05-06. On 1999-02-08, the station changed its call sign to the current WDBQ-FM
As WJOD the station broadcast a country music format, which is now located at 103.3 MHz.

WDBQ-FM changed formats from oldies (60s and 70s) to the more modern classic hits format, which focuses more on music from the 1970s and 1980s, on November 14, 2008. The "Oldies 107.5" moniker was also replaced, WDBQ-FM now goes as "Q107.5".

On August 30, 2013, a deal was announced in which Cumulus Media would swap its stations in Dubuque (including WDBQ-FM) and Poughkeepsie, New York to Townsquare Media in exchange for Peak Broadcasting's Fresno, California stations. The deal was part of Cumulus' acquisition of Dial Global; Townsquare, Peak, and Dial Global are all controlled by Oaktree Capital Management. The sale to Townsquare was completed on November 14, 2013.

References

External links

DBQ
Oldies radio stations in the United States
Townsquare Media radio stations